Linoleate 10R-lipoxygenase (10R-DOX, (10R)-dioxygenase, 10R-dioxygenase) is an enzyme with systematic name linoleate:oxygen (10R)-oxidoreductase. This enzyme catalyses the following chemical reaction

 linoleate + O2  (8E,10R,12Z)-10-hydroperoxy-8,12-octadecadienoate

Linoleate 10R-lipoxygenase is involved in biosynthesis of oxylipins.

References

External links 
 

EC 1.13.11